Frederick Whittlesey (June 12, 1799 – September 19, 1851) was a U.S. Representative from New York, cousin of Elisha Whittlesey and Thomas Tucker Whittlesey.

Born in New Preston, Connecticut, Whittlesey pursued academic studies.
He graduated from Yale College in 1818 where he studied law.
He was admitted to the bar in Utica, New York, in 1821 and commenced practice in Cooperstown, New York, early in 1822. Later in the year he moved to Rochester, New York where he became Treasurer of Monroe County in 1829 and 1830.

Whittlesey was elected as an Anti-Masonic candidate to the Twenty-second and Twenty-third Congresses (March 4, 1831 – March 3, 1835).
He served as chairman of the Committee on Expenditures in the Department of War (Twenty-third Congress) before resuming the practice of law. Whittlesey served as the City Attorney of Rochester in 1838 and as vice chancellor of the eighth judicial district of New York in 1839–1847.
He became justice of the State supreme court in 1847 and 1848 and then a professor of law at Genesee College (now Syracuse University) in 1850 and 1851. He was also Vice President of the University of Rochester. He died of typhus fever in Rochester, New York, September 19, 1851 and was interred in Mount Hope Cemetery.

References

External links

1799 births
1851 deaths
People from New Preston, Connecticut
Anti-Masonic Party members of the United States House of Representatives from New York (state)
19th-century American politicians
Yale College alumni
Litchfield Law School alumni
Burials at Mount Hope Cemetery (Rochester)